Reverential capitalization is the practice of capitalizing religious words that refer to deities or divine beings in cases where the words would not otherwise have been capitalized. Pronouns are also particularly included in reverential capitalization:

In this example, the proper name "God", like "Day" and "Night", is capitalized and the pronoun "He" is a reverential capitalization. While proper names are capitalized universally, reverence for any particular divinity is not universal. In short, when pronouns that are usually lowercase are capitalized, this usually implies that the author personally reveres and regards as a deity the antecedent of that pronoun.

Nouns that are not proper names can also be capitalized out of reverence to the entity to which they refer. Examples include "the Lord", "the Father" and "the Creator".

Capitalizing nouns

Capitalization, punctuation and spelling were not well standardized in early Modern English; for example, the 1611 King James Bible did not capitalize pronouns:

In the 17th and 18th centuries, it became common to capitalize all nouns, as is still done in some other Germanic languages, including German.

In languages that capitalize all nouns, reverential capitalization of the first two letters or the whole word can sometimes be seen. The following is an example in Danish, which capitalized nouns until 1948.

Note that some instances are in all caps ( "GOD"), and some begin with two capital letters ( "LOrd",  "JEsus"). Some words that could also be said to refer to an almighty being begin with a single capital ( "Creator",  "Christ",  "the Father"), but so do all other nouns ( "Things"). This type of reverential capitalization varies within a single sentence and would also be dependent on the author and the publisher of a work.

The convention of capitalizing nouns was eventually abandoned in English, and one of the people who was influential in this was Benjamin Blayney, who produced a 1769 edition of the Bible in which nouns were not capitalized—possibly simply to save space on the printed page.

Capitalisation is also customarily applied in religious texts written in Tagalog and other Philippine languages. This is despite the practice being considered non-standard and inconsistent by purists, who contend it applies only to English.

Capitalizing pronouns
In the 19th century, it became common to capitalize pronouns referring to the God of the Abrahamic religions, in order to show respect:

An interesting early case is Handel's 1741 oratorio Messiah, whose printed libretto and published score both use lower case pronouns, but whose holograph conductor's score consistently capitalizes: 

In the 20th century this practice became far less common:

Today there is no widely accepted rule in English on whether or not to use reverential capitalization. Different house styles have different rules given by their style manuals. The Christian Writer's Manual of Style, The Chicago Manual of Style, and the Associated Press Stylebook do not recommend it. It is prescribed, for example, by the US Government Printing Office Style Manual (2008).

It is also seen in King James 21st Century Edition and Biblehub's King James Purple Letter Edition.

See also

References

Orthography
Christian symbols